Diomidis Anastasiou Kyriakos (1811, Spetses – 1869, Pisa) was a Greek author, politician and Prime Minister of Greece.

Biography
Kiriakos was born in 1811 on the island of Spetses to family of Arvanite origin. He was the younger brother of Ioannis Kyriakos, a vice-admiral who was killed in the siege of Messolonghi. He studied law at the universities of Pisa and Paris. In 1835, Kyriakos became public prosecutor of the Court of First Instance. In 1843, he helped draft the Constitution of Greece. In 1851, he became professor of constitutional law and, in 1862, a member of the committee to draft a new constitution. The following year, Kyriakos became Minister of Religion and Education and, between April and May 1863, he became the Prime Minister of Greece. Kyriakos authored several books on law and history. He died in Italy in 1869.

References

Arvanites
1811 births
1869 deaths
19th-century prime ministers of Greece
People from Spetses
Prime Ministers of Greece
Ministers of National Education and Religious Affairs of Greece
Greek legal scholars
Academic staff of the National and Kapodistrian University of Athens
University of Paris alumni
University of Pisa alumni